Douglas Bruce Berry (January 24, 1924 – September 30, 1998) was an American comic book artist who is best known as the inker of several of Jack Kirby's comic book series in the 1970s.

Biography
D. Bruce Berry was born in Oakland, California and served in the United States Army Air Forces during World War II. He worked in the advertising industry for 29 years and drew for various fanzines including Bill Spicer's Fantasy Illustrated in 1963–1964. Berry and Spicer collaborated with Eando Binder on an Adam Link story which won the 1964 Alley Award in the category "Best Fan Comic Strip". In the late 1960s, he moved to Los Angeles. He began inking and lettering Jack Kirby's Kamandi series as of issue #16 (April 1974) and worked with Kirby for the next two years. In 2019, TwoMorrows Publishing released Jack Kirby's Dingbat Love, a collection of previously unpublished work which Kirby had drawn for DC Comics in the 1970s. This included a "Dingbats of Danger Street" story inked by Berry.

Bibliography

Bill Spicer
 Fantasy Illustrated #1–2 (1963–1964)

DC Comics

 1st Issue Special #1 (Atlas), #5 (Manhunter) (1975)
 DC Graphic Novel #4 ("The Hunger Dogs") (1985)
 Kamandi #16–37 (1974–1976)
 Kobra #1 (1976)
 New Gods vol. 2 #6 (1984)
 OMAC #2–7 (1974–1975)
 Our Fighting Forces #151–152, 154–155, 161–162 (The Losers) (1974–1975)
 Richard Dragon, Kung-Fu Fighter #3 (1975)

Marvel Comics
 Amazing Adventures #33 (Killraven) (1975)
 Captain America #191–192, 195–196 (1975–1976)

Pacific Comics
 Silver Star #3–6 (1983–1984)

Texas Trio
 Star-Studded Comics #6 (1965)

TwoMorrows Publishing
 Jack Kirby's Dingbat Love (Dingbats of Danger Street) (2019)

References

External links
 
 D. Bruce Berry at Mike's Amazing World of Comics
 D. Bruce Berry at the Unofficial Handbook of Marvel Comics Creators

1924 births
1998 deaths
20th-century American artists
Advertising artists and illustrators
American comics artists
Artists from Oakland, California
Comic book letterers
Comics inkers
DC Comics people
Silver Age comics creators
United States Army Air Forces personnel of World War II